Vietnam competed in the 2008 Asian Beach Games, held in Bali, Indonesia from October 18 to October 26, 2008.

Vietnam ranked 10th in the said competition with 2 gold medals, 5 silver medals and 3 bronze medals.

Medallists

Nations at the 2008 Asian Beach Games
2008
Asian Beach Games